The Wayland Historic District is a predominantly residential historic district on the east side of Providence, Rhode Island. This area, which was in the 19th century part of the Moses Brown farm, was platted for development in 1891, with most of the construction taking place in the early decades of the 20th century. Most of the residential properties in the district are single-family houses, typically built in revival styles popular at the time. They are set on similarly sized lots with fairly uniform setbacks, and were typically built without garages (which were often added later). There are a number of two-family houses, and a small number of apartment buildings, most of which are found on the arterial roads of the area. There are several religious buildings, including several churches; the most architecturally distinctive religious building is the Jewish Temple Beth El, built 1951–54.

The district was listed on the National Register of Historic Places in 2005.

See also
National Register of Historic Places listings in Providence, Rhode Island

References

Historic districts in Providence County, Rhode Island
Geography of Providence, Rhode Island
Unofficial neighborhoods of Providence, Rhode Island
National Register of Historic Places in Providence, Rhode Island
Historic districts on the National Register of Historic Places in Rhode Island